Recovery was launched at Yarmouth, Nova Scotia in 1802. She transferred her registry to Quebec City, Quebec in 1806, and to London in 1807. She traded to the Cape of Good Hope and the West Indies. In January 1812 she was condemned at Nevis after she had sustained damage at sea.

Career
Recovery first appeared in Lloyd's Register (LR) in 1807.

On the 14th, off Beachy Head, she had encountered two French privateer luggers, each of about 100 men, and repulsed them after an engagement of an hour and a half.

On 21 October 1809 she was returning to Portsmouth from Corruna when she saw a French privateer lugger capture two merchant vessels off the Isles of Scilly.

Fate
On 19 January 1811 Recovery, Clark, master, sailed from Nevis. She met with considerable damage shortly thereafter and had to put back into Nevis, where she was to unload. She was condemned at Nevis. The volume of LR for 1812 carried the annotation "Condemned".

Citations

1802 ships
Ships built in Canada
Age of Sail merchant ships of England
Maritime incidents in 1811